Mazandeh (also known as Abū Sa‘īd-e Sabbāned-e Yek, Abū Sa‘īd-e Sabbāneh-ye Yek, and Shāveh-ye Mazzandeh) is a village in Azadeh Rural District, Moshrageh District, Ramshir County, Khuzestan Province, Iran. At the 2006 census, its population was 90, in 18 families.

References 

Populated places in Ramshir County